Andrew Katos (born 21 June 1970) is an Australian politician. He was the member for South Barwon in the Victorian Legislative Assembly from 2010 to 2018.

References

External links
 Parliamentary voting record of Andrew Katos at Victorian Parliament Tracker

1970 births
Living people
Members of the Victorian Legislative Assembly
Liberal Party of Australia members of the Parliament of Victoria
Deakin University alumni
Australian people of Greek descent
Politicians from Geelong
21st-century Australian politicians